Davison Peak is a coastal peak,  high, located  east of Hobbs Peak in the Denton Hills, Victoria Land. It was named after William Davison of the Zoology Department, Canterbury University, who from 1983 specialized in Antarctic fish research.

References 

Mountains of Victoria Land
Scott Coast